Purity Cherotich Rionoripo (born 10 June 1993) is a Kenyan long-distance runner.

She won the Copenhagen Half Marathon in 2015 in 1:08:29 as well as the Lisbon Marathon in 2:25:09 hrs. She reached her personal best in 2017 winning the Paris Marathon

References

External links

1993 births
Living people
Kenyan female marathon runners
Kenyan female long-distance runners
Kenyan female cross country runners
Paris Marathon female winners
21st-century Kenyan women